An endless runway is an aircraft runway which loops around to form a shape such as a circle.  There were experiments with this concept in the 1960s and it is now being researched at the Nederlands Lucht- en Ruimtevaartcentrumthe national aerospace laboratory of the Netherlands.

History 
With the birth of aviation, the thought of taking a car to the office became old-style and soon people started to invent ways to take the airplane to the office. In an article in "Popular Science" from 1919, a circular runway was designed on top of some skyscrapers in New York, where one of the buildings would serve the purpose of aircraft parking. A design was made for a circular runway on the roof of Kings Cross railway station in London.

In the 1960s, the idea was taken up by a marine officer, who actually performed a number of take-offs and landings with aircraft at a circular track designed for testing cars. This work stimulated a large number of patents with runways shaped as circles or ovals and often straight tracks attached to it for taking off and landing.

In the 2010s, the idea was studied by a European consortium led by an engineer at the Royal Netherlands Aerospace Centre.  Their plans for a pilot included a smaller circular runway for delivery drones.

Safety issues
Increased runway width. Instrument Landing System can be used for the straight approach but will require modification or a new system to cope with the curving runway. Water will run off the banked runway better than at present. Use of residual heat from car parks and offices could be used to heat the runway to reduce ice.

References

External links
 Video link of proposed runway

Airport engineering